The Punta della Rossa (also known as Rothorn) is a mountain of the Lepontine Alps on the Swiss-Italian border. The name of the mount, in both languages, refers to the red colour of the rocks on this mountain.

References

External links
 Scherbadung on Hikr

Mountains of the Alps
Two-thousanders of Switzerland
Two-thousanders of Italy
Italy–Switzerland border
International mountains of Europe
Mountains of Valais
Lepontine Alps